Sadashiv Kisan Lokhande is a member of the 17th Lok Sabha of India. He represents the Shirdi constituency of Maharashtra and is a member of the Shiv Sena political party.

He was elected to Maharashtra Legislative Assembly from Karjat Vidhan Sabha constituency in Ahmednagar district for three consecutive terms in 1995, 1999 and 2004 as BJP candidate.

Positions held
 1995: Elected to Maharashtra Legislative Assembly (1st term)
 1999: Re-elected to Maharashtra Legislative Assembly (2nd term)
 2004: Re-elected to Maharashtra Legislative Assembly (3rd term)
 2014: Elected to 16th Lok Sabha (1st Term) 
 2019: Re-Elected to 17th Lok Sabha (2nd Term)

References

External links
 Shivsena official website 
 http://india.gov.in/my-government/indian-parliament/sadashiv-kisan-lokhande

Living people
1962 births
People from Ahmednagar district
Shiv Sena politicians
Lok Sabha members from Maharashtra
India MPs 2014–2019
India MPs 2019–present
Maharashtra MLAs 1995–1999
Maharashtra MLAs 1999–2004
Maharashtra MLAs 2004–2009
Marathi politicians
Bharatiya Janata Party politicians from Maharashtra